Dello may refer to:

People
 Dello di Niccolò Delli (ca. 1403 – ca. 1470), an Italian artist
 Pete Dello (born 1942), English singer-songwriter

Places
 Dello, Lombardy, a comune in the province of Brescia, Italy
 Lake Déllő, Hungary